Donald William Kemp (21 July 1914 – 22 April 1973) was an Australian rules footballer who played with North Melbourne in the VFL. Kemp was North Melbourne's best and fairest winner in 1943 and when he retired in 1947 finished one game short of joining the 100 game club.

References

External links

1914 births
1973 deaths
Australian rules footballers from Melbourne
North Melbourne Football Club players
Syd Barker Medal winners
People from Kensington, Victoria